

The treaty of Marienburg, concluded on 29 June 1656, was a Brandenburg-Prussian – Swedish alliance during the Second Northern War.

In January 1656, Charles X Gustav of Sweden had made Frederick William I, Elector of Brandenburg, his vassal for the Duchy of Prussia. By the time of the treaty of Marienburg, Swedish prospect in the war had diminished, and Charles X Gustav was willing to offer Frederick William I a reward for fighting on his side. While the latter was to remain a Swedish vassal for Prussia, he was promised hereditary sovereignty in four voivodeships of Greater Poland in return for participating in the Charles X Gustav's Polish campaigns. This alliance proved victorious in the subsequent Battle of Warsaw, but as further campaigns stalled, Frederick William I was to gain full sovereignty in Prussia by the Treaty of Labiau in November 1656.

Sources

References

Bibliography

Erdmannsdörffer, Bernhard: Friedrich Wilhelm (Kurfürst von Brandenburg), in: Allgemeine Deutsche Biographie, published by Historische Kommission bei der Bayerischen Akademie der Wissenschaften, Band 7 (1878), pp. 480–497, fulltext at de.wikisource

External links
Scan of the treaty of Marienburg at ieg-mainz.de (Institut für Europäische Geschichte Mainz), 18 pages

Second Northern War
1656 treaties
Treaties of the Swedish Empire
Marienburg
17th-century military alliances
Military alliances involving Sweden
1656 in Europe
1656 in Sweden